Outside the Law is a 2002 American direct-to-video action film, starring Cynthia Rothrock, Seamus Dever, Jessica Stier, Jeff Wincott and Stephen Macht. It was directed by Jorge Montesi.

Plot
A secret agent is about to face her most dangerous mission yet.

Cast
 Cynthia Rothrock as Julie Cosgrove
 Seamus Dever as Rick Michell
 Jessica Stier as Rita
 Jeff Wincott as Michael Peyton
 Stephen Macht as Dick Dawson
 Brad Greenquist as Agent McKenzie

Reception
The Move Scene gave the movie a bad review stating that: "What this all boils down to is that "Outside the Law" is not a great Cynthia Rothrock movie and unfortunately the editing and camera work robs the audience of what they watch the movie for which is Rothrock kicking butt. But for action fans it is just about watchable even if it is all incredibly familiar". Robert Pardi from TV Guide the film two of four possible stars, concluding: "A well-constructed star vehicle, this vigorous action flick exploits Rothrock's athletic prowess without taxing her acting skill. Her unique niche as a female action icon remains secure in this fast-paced, escapist trifle".

Outside the Law currently holds an 86% score on Rotten Tomatoes and is regarded as "Fresh".

References

External links
 
 
 
 Outside the Law at The Movie Scene

2002 films
2000s English-language films
Films directed by Jorge Montesi
American direct-to-video films
American action films
2000s American films